Glion is a village in the municipality of Montreux in the canton of Vaud, Switzerland. The village is located 700 m.a.s.l., overlooking Lake Geneva.

The position of this village in Montreux and the Chauderon Gorge made it a touristic destination in the 19th century.

Glion is known for being the first headquarters of the Glion Institute of Higher Education hospitality school. It is also the location of the Institut Villa Pierrefeu.

The first conference of the Glion Colloquium was held in Glion.

This place is where Henri Nestlé died of a heart attack in 1890.

See also

Villages in the canton of Vaud